is a 1982 Japanese film directed by Kinji Fukasaku, with art direction by Akira Takahashi. It was chosen as the Best Film at the Japan Academy Prize ceremony.

Plot
Ginshiro Kuraoka, an actor for Toei, becomes jealous of the number of close-ups his co-star Tachibana is getting as they are filming a samurai film. After a fan named Tomoko has Ginshiro sign her inner thigh, Ginshiro sends his lackey Yasu Muraoka after her to obtain her phone number. 

Ginshiro drowns his sorrows in alcohol, then Yasu brings him home, where the actress Konatsu is waiting for him. Konatsu is pregnant with Ginshiro's child and is unwilling to get an abortion for fear that she may not have another chance to have a child, so Ginshiro convinces Yasu to marry her. Yasu stamps the marriage certificate but Konatsu is disgusted with him for letting Ginshiro walk all over him. Yasu reveals a poster on his wall of her first film and says that he has been a fan for ten years. She tries to leave but collapses from toxemia. Yasu tells the doctors that he is the father of the unborn child.

Yasu begins taking on multiple stunt roles to pay for the expenses and sustains multiple injuries. When Tomoko seems like she might leave him, Ginshiro asks Konatsu to tell her how wonderful he is, which she does. Konatsu and Yasu find happiness but Tomoko does not take care of Ginshiro the way that Konatsu used to so he proposes to Konatsu with a 30-million-yen four-carat ring that he sold his house to buy. When she rejects him, he drives off set. Konatsu and Yasu get married.

When Ginshiro does not show up to film his scenes, Yasu finds him hiding in a warehouse. Ginshiro confesses that Tachibana took his place as the January model for a new model, that the film he was to shoot in the summer has been cancelled, and that he and Tomoko have broken up. Tachibana is gaining more screen time while Ginshiro's character is being killed off and his scenes are being cut, including his final fight scene on a giant 30-foot staircase because no stunt performer can be found who is willing to take the fall down it.

Yasu volunteers to take the fall down the staircase. He receives one million yen in hazard pay after signing a release to free the studio from liability, then takes out a 30-million-yen life insurance policy on himself. Konatsu asks him not to perform the stunt but he insists on it. After Yasu leaves to perform the stunt, Konatsu packs her things and leaves. Studio executives and theater owners visit to watch the stunt, so Yasu places a nail on the stairs and steps on it to see how everyone caters to him. When he demands that his cigarette must be lit by an expensive lighter, Ginshiro uses an expensive one to light it before slapping Yasu. Yasu thanks him profusely and says that he will work on his performance, so he postpones the stunt until after dinner. Yasu performs the stunt and is seriously injured but uses his remaining strength to crawl up the stairs again for a memorable death scene as Ginshiro cheers him on. Konatsu arrives in time to see the ambulance taking Yasu away.

Konatsu gives birth, then opens her eyes to see Yasu holding the baby. They agree to stay together as a family, then the director yells "Cut!" and the walls are pulled away to reveal the cast and crew of the film.

Cast
Keiko Matsuzaka as Konatsu
Morio Kazama as Ginshiro
Mitsuru Hirata as Yasu
Chika Takami as Tomoko
Daijiro Harada as Tachibana
Keizo Kanie as Film Director
Rei Okamoto as Toku-san
Hyoei Enoki as Tome
Nagare Hagiwara as Yuji
Toshiya Sakai as Makoto
Akihiro Shimizu
Nijiko Kiyokawa as Yasu's mother
Sonny Chiba as himself
Hiroyuki Sanada as himself
Etsuko Shihomi as herself
Seizo Fukumoto
Akira Shioji as Yamada

Awards
4th Yokohama Film Festival 
Won: Best Supporting Actor - Mitsuru Hirata
2nd Best Film

Song
"Kamata koshin-kyoku" is the title of a cover version of "Song of the Vagabonds" from the 1929 operetta The Vagabond King by Rudolph Friml. It was released as a single by Shochiku Kamata studio, the film's studio. The song was originally performed by Yutaka Kawasaki and Naoko Soga. In the film, Keiko Ishizaka, Morio Kazama, and Mitsuru Hirata sing it.

Postage stamp
An 80-yen Japanese commemorative postage stamp featuring an image from the film was issued on October 10, 2006.

Bibliography

References

External links
 

1982 films
Films directed by Kinji Fukasaku
1980s Japanese-language films
Shochiku films
Films about actors
Films about stunt performers
Films about filmmaking
Films set in Kyoto
Picture of the Year Japan Academy Prize winners
Best Film Kinema Junpo Award winners
1980s Japanese films